Joshua Utanga (born 7 June 1988) is a Cook Islands sprint canoeist. At the 2012 Summer Olympics, he competed in the Men's K-1 200 metres.

Personal life
Utanga was raised in Tauranga, New Zealand, by parents Nga and Sandra. When he was 18, he left home and lived in Gold Coast.

Career
Utanga first competed at an international level in the canoe sprint at the 2009 world championships in Canada. He later participated at the 2012 Summer Olympics as part of the Cook Islands team; his paternal grandparents were from the Cook Islands. He was sponsored for this by the International Canoeing Federation, through an International Olympic Committee development scheme.

References

External links
 

Cook Island male canoeists
1988 births
Living people
Olympic canoeists of the Cook Islands
Canoeists at the 2012 Summer Olympics